Olive Patricia Dickason  (1920–2011) was a Métis historian and journalist. She was the first scholar in Canada to receive a PHD in Indigenous history. She is known for writing one of the first textbooks about First Nations in Canada, Canada's First Nations: A History of Founding Peoples from the Earliest Times.

Personal life 
Dickason was born on 6 March 1920 in Winnipeg, Manitoba, to parents Frank Leonard Williamson and Phoebe Philomena Côté, who had Métis heritage. Her father worked for the Bank of Montreal and her mother was a schoolteacher. Her family moved to the Interlake region after losing everything they owned in the 1929 stock market crash. There, her mother taught her and her sister Alice how to hunt, trap, and fish to provide food for the family. The family was unable to send Dickason for more schooling after grade 10 because of their poor financial situation.

Encouraged by her mentor, the priest Athol Murray, she decided to finish high school. He accepted her as the lone girl in his all-boys namesak Notre Dame College in Saskatchewan. She completed a Bachelor of Arts degree in French and philosophy at Notre Dame College, an affiliate of the University of Ottawa. She was the first scholar in Canada to receive a PHD in Indigenous history.

Dickason had three daughters: Anne, Clare, and Roberta. Olive Dickason died on 12 March 2011, one week after her 91st birthday.

Career 
She began a 24-year career in journalism at the Regina Leader-Post and subsequently, worked as a writer and editor at the Winnipeg Free Press, the Montreal Gazette, and The Globe and Mail. She promoted coverage of First Nations and women's issues.

In 1970, aged 50, she entered the Master of History program at the University of Ottawa. She had to struggle with faculty preconceptions regarding Aboriginal history – including arguments that it did not exist – before finally finding a professor, Cornelius Jaenen, to act as her academic advisor. "I was lucky ... [a] Belgian fellow, who didn't know much about Native people, but knew a lot about discrimination, took up my cause, and the university eventually admitted me." She completed her master's degree at the University of Ottawa with the thesis Louisburg and the Indians: A Study in Imperial Race Relations, 1713–1760 two years later, and her PhD in 1977. Her doctoral thesis, entitled The Myth of the Savage, was eventually published as were Canada's First Nations: A History of Founding Peoples from the Earliest Times and The Native Imprint: The Contribution of First Peoples to Canada's Character -- Volume 1: to 1815 (1995), which she edited. In addition she also wrote Indian Arts in Canada, which won three awards for conception and design and coauthored The Law of Nations and the New World.

Dickason was appointed an assistant professor at the University of Alberta in 1976. She received tenure as Full Professor in 1985, the same year she turned 65–the age of mandatory retirement as enforced by the University of Alberta's mandatory policy. Dickason filed a complaint with the Alberta Human Rights Commission against the University of Alberta, claiming its mandatory retirement policy was a violation of the Alberta Individual's Rights Protections Act. Dickason won her case in the human rights board of inquiry and the Alberta Queen's Bench, but lost in the Alberta Court of Appeal and then in the Supreme Court of Canada, the latter by a 4–3 split among the judges. She retired from the University of Alberta at age 72 and renewed her relationship with the University of Ottawa. Her time as a professor and her significant contributions to the literature of history in Canada have influenced a whole generation of scholars, and will continue to be the basis for much historical work done in the future.

Awards 
Olive was awarded the Order of Canada in 1996, and was the recipient of the Aboriginal Achievement Award, now the Indspire Awards, in 1997. She has also been the recipient of numerous honorary doctorates throughout the years.

Biography 
Préfontaine, Darren R. (2021). Changing Canadian History: The Life and Works of Olive Patricia Dickason. Saskatoon: Gabriel Dumont Institute Press.

Bibliography

References

1920 births
2011 deaths
Canadian women non-fiction writers
Journalists from Manitoba
Writers from Winnipeg
20th-century Canadian historians
Indspire Awards
Canadian women historians
21st-century Canadian historians